This is a list of recipients of the The State of Kuwait Prize for the Control of Cancer, Cardiovascular Diseases and Diabetes in the Eastern Mediterranean Region awarded by World Health Organization (WHO).

The Foundation was formed in 2003 by the State of Kuwait and awarded an individual who has made an exceptional contribution to the prevention, control, or study of diabetes, cardiovascular disease, or cancer. The prize, which consists of a bronze medal and an amount of money estimated to be worth $5,000 USD, can be awarded to one or more people once a year.

List of recipients

See also 

 List of Ihsan Doğramacı Family Health Foundation Prize laureates
 List of Léon Bernard Foundation Prize laureates
 List of Sasakawa Health Prize laureates
 List of United Arab Emirates Health Foundation Prize laureates
 List of Sheikh Sabah Al-Ahmad Al-Jaber Al-Sabah Prize laureates
 List of Dr LEE Jong-wook Memorial Prize for Public Health laureates
 List of Dr A.T. Shousha Foundation Prize and Fellowship laureates
 List of Jacques Parisot Foundation Fellowship laureates
 List of The Darling Foundation Prize laureates

References 

World Health Organization
Public health
WHO laureates